The Saratoga Special Stakes is an American grade II thoroughbred horse race run annually in mid-August at Saratoga Race Course in Saratoga Springs, New York. The race is for two-year-olds willing to race six furlongs on the dirt.

With its first run in 1901, the Saratoga Special was a winner-take-all race until 1959 when it became a standard stakes race. The race was held at Belmont Park on the Widener Course in 1943, 1944, and 1945. There was no race in 1911 and 1912 due to the New York State legislated ban on parimutuel betting that led to the closure of all New York racetracks. There was also no race held in 2004.

Since inception it has been contested at various distances:
 5.5 furlongs : 1901–1906
 6 furlongs : 1907–1993, 2005, 2020
  furlongs : 1994–2003, 2006–2019

Only four horses have ever won all three Saratoga Racecourse events for two-year-olds. Regret (1914), Campfire (1916), Dehere (1993), and City Zip (2000) each swept the Saratoga Special, Sanford Stakes and Hopeful Stakes.

Records
Speed record:
 at  furlongs – 1:15.57 Corfu (2013)
 at 6 furlongs – 1:09 – General Assembly (1978)

Most wins by a jockey:
 7 – Eddie Arcaro (1935, 1947, 1950, 1954, 1955, 1958, 1959)

Most wins by a trainer:
 6 – James G. Rowe Sr. (1904, 1914, 1915, 1920, 1922, 1929)

Most wins by an owner:
 4 – Harry Payne Whitney (1914, 1920, 1922, 1929)
 4 – George D. Widener (1923, 1930, 1950, 1969)

Winners

In 1953, Porterhouse finished first, but was disqualified and set back to last.
† In 1935, there was a dead heat for first.

References

External links 
 Video at YouTube of the 1993 Saratoga Special Stakes
 The Saratoga Special Stakes at Pedigree Query

1901 establishments in New York (state)
Horse races in New York (state)
Saratoga Race Course
Flat horse races for two-year-olds
Graded stakes races in the United States
Grade 2 stakes races in the United States
Recurring sporting events established in 1901